The 1968 Bathurst Gold Star Trophy was a motor race staged at the Mount Panorama Circuit near Bathurst in New South Wales, Australia on 15 April 1968. The race was contested over 30 laps at a total distance of approximately 115 miles and it was Round 1 of the 1968 Australian Drivers' Championship.

The race was won by Phil West driving a Brabham BT23A Repco.

Results

References

Bathurst Gold Star Trophy
Motorsport in Bathurst, New South Wales